The Oz Music Show is an Australian radio program broadcast by the Australian Broadcasting Corporation's Triple J as well as on Radio Australia shortwave radio network. Oz Music Show was first screened in 1991.

Since 1991, the program hosted by Richard Kingsmill broadcast Wednesday nights 10pm to 1am, features included Australian music, interviews and touring information, as well as CDs played by the music programmers and djs to have a listen. Independent bands and music labels are featured as well. There's a live performance recorded in the Triple J studios each week.

Oz Music plays the music videos on Rage featured includes the new Australian music.

In 2006, triple j tv was launched as a successor programme.

External links
 The Oz Music Show on triple j (Richard Kingsmill's Australian Music program on triple j radio)

Triple J programs
Australian Broadcasting Corporation radio programs
Australian Broadcasting Corporation original programming